The Medicine Bow Union Pacific Depot was built 1912–1919 in Medicine Bow, Wyoming for the Union Pacific Railway. It is a typical example of Union Pacific railway architecture with a hipped clay shingle roof with broad overhangs supported by brackets over a one-story wood-frame station structure. The depot features a projecting bay designed to allow the station master to see incoming trains. The western section of the building contained the waiting room, the station office and a baggage room, while the eastern section contained living quarters for the stationmaster and his family. The station functioned in its original purpose until May 1981.

The Medicine Bow Depot was placed on the National Register of Historic Places on November 1, 1982. The building is occupied by the Medicine Bow Museum.

References

External links

 Medicine Bow Depot at the Wyoming State Historic Preservation Office

National Register of Historic Places in Carbon County, Wyoming
Railway stations in the United States opened in 1912
Museums in Carbon County, Wyoming
Former Union Pacific Railroad stations
Railway stations on the National Register of Historic Places in Wyoming
Former railway stations in Wyoming
1912 establishments in Wyoming